Streptomyces chryseus is a bacterium species from the genus of Streptomyces.

Further reading

See also 
 List of Streptomyces species

References

External links
Type strain of Streptomyces chryseus at BacDive -  the Bacterial Diversity Metadatabase

chryseus
Bacteria described in 1970